My Brother may refer to:

 My Brother (book), a biography of Muhammad Ali Jinnah, the founder of Pakistan
 My Brother (2004 film), a Korean film starring Won Bin
 My Brother (2006 film), a film starring Vanessa L. Williams and Tatum O'Neal

See also
 My Brother's Keeper (disambiguation)